This is a list of Georgian administrative divisions (mkhare) by Human Development Index as of 2021. This also includes Adjara, a historical, geographic and political-administrative region of Georgia, and Tbilisi, the capital and largest city. There is no data for the Autonomous Republic of Abkhazia available

References 

Georgia
Human Development Index
Regions By Human Development Index
HDI